Frederick Norman Smith Creek  (12 January 1898 – 26 July 1980) was an English amateur footballer who was associated with the Corinthian amateur team for many years. He made one appearance as a centre forward for the full England team and five for the England amateur team.

Career
Creek was born in Darlington, County Durham, and first played representative football for Darlington Grammar School.

During the First World War he served as a second lieutenant in a Territorial Force battalion of the Durham Light Infantry, until being seconded to the Royal Flying Corps on 8 December 1917 to serve as a flying officer (observer). He was subsequently awarded the Military Cross, which was gazetted on 10 May 1918. His citation read:
Second Lieutenant Frederick Norman Smith Creek, Durham Light Infantry and Royal Flying Corps.
"For conspicuous gallantry and devotion to duty. He carried out several successful reconnaissances of enemy aerodromes and railways, and obtained valuable information often under the most difficult weather conditions. On one occasion he took several photographs of an enemy aerodrome though he was attacked by an enemy machine and subjected to anti-aircraft fire. He displayed the greatest skill and determination."

On 1 August 1919 Creek was awarded a permanent commission in the Royal Air Force with the rank of lieutenant. However, he was transferred to the unemployed list on 12 September 1919, and his permanent commission cancelled on the 16th.

He then went up to Cambridge University where he won his first "Blue" in 1920. Injury prevented him playing in 1921, but he earned his second blue the following year.

He first began playing for Corinthian in 1919 and remained associated with the club until the 1930s. He signed amateur forms with Darlington and made two Football League appearances between 1922 and 1924.

His solitary appearance for the England team came on 10 May 1923, when he scored in a 4–1 victory over France although he also won five caps for the England amateur team, scoring four goals on his debut.

Between 1923 and 1954, he worked as a schoolteacher at Dauntsey's School, Wiltshire teaching "games" and Geography, during which time he also played cricket for Wiltshire. While at the school, he helped organise the Local Defence Volunteers.

He was also a cricket writer for the Daily Telegraph, and wrote various books including "A History of the Corinthian Football Club" (1933) and "Centre Half – Attack or Defence?".

Creek returned to military service during the Second World War, being granted a commission for the duration of hostilities as an acting pilot officer on probation in the Training Branch of the Royal Air Force Volunteer Reserve on 9 March 1941. He was confirmed in his rank on 9 September. On 28 May 1943, by which time he was an acting flight lieutenant, Creek was made a Member of the Order of the British Empire.

After retiring from playing he continued his association with the England amateur team as their manager. He was also managed the Great Britain Olympic Football Team during the 1950s and 1960s, whilst working for the Football Association.

References

External links

England profile
Corinthian Casuals F.C. – Player profiles

1898 births
1980 deaths
Footballers from Darlington
Alumni of Trinity College, Cambridge
English footballers
English football managers
England international footballers
England amateur international footballers
Association football forwards
Darlington F.C. players
Corinthian F.C. players
Cambridge University A.F.C. players
English cricketers
Wiltshire cricketers
Durham Light Infantry officers
Royal Flying Corps officers
Royal Air Force personnel of World War I
Royal Air Force Volunteer Reserve personnel of World War II
Recipients of the Military Cross
Members of the Order of the British Empire
British sportswriters
Olympic football managers of Great Britain
British Army personnel of World War I
Royal Air Force officers